Guy Wittenoom Hockley   (1869-1946) was Archdeacon of Cornwall from 1925 until his death.

He was educated at Balliol College, Oxford and ordained in 1893. After  curacies at Hawarden and Westminster he was Domestic Chaplain to the  Bishop of Worcester from 1903 until 1905; and the Bishop of Birmingham from 1905 until 1906. He was Vicar of St Saviour, Hoxton from 1906 until 1908 and  then of St Matthew's, Westminster from 1908 until 1914. He was Rector of Heathfield, Somerset from 1914 to 1916. He was Rural Dean of North Liverpool from 1916 to 1925.

He died on 16 September 1946.

References

1869 births
Alumni of Balliol College, Oxford
Archdeacons of Cornwall
1946 deaths